The Roman Catholic Diocese of Kabinda is a Latin suffragan  diocese in the Ecclesiastical province of Kananga in the Democratic Republic of the Congo.

Its cathedral episcopal see is  located in the city of Kabinda.

History 
 March 24, 1953: Established as Apostolic Vicariate of Kabinda from the Apostolic Vicariate of Luluabourg
 November 10, 1959: Promoted as Diocese of Kabinda
 Lost territory on 33 November 1963 to establish the Apostolic Administration of Mbuji-Mayi
 On 1966.03.10, it gained territory from Diocese of Kongolo, and lost territory to Diocese of Kamina 
 Lost territory again on 1974.01.12 to the above Diocese of Kamina

Ordinaries 
 Apostolic Vicars of Kabinda 
 Georges Kettel (1953.03.24 – 1959.11.10), Titular Bishop of Thabraca (1953.03.24 – 1959.11.10)

 Bishops of Kabinda
 Georges Kettel (1959.11.10 – 1968.12.19), later Titular Bishop of Caorle (1968.12.19 – 1972.07.16)
 Matthieu Kanyama (1968.12.16 – 1995.11.02)
 Valentin Masengo Mkinda (1995.11.02 - 2018.10.26)
 Félicien Ntambue Kasembe (2020.07.23 - present)

See also 
 Roman Catholicism in the Democratic Republic of the Congo

Source and External links 
 GCatholic.org
 Catholic Hierarchy

Kabinda
Roman Catholic dioceses in the Democratic Republic of the Congo
Christian organizations established in 1953
Roman Catholic dioceses and prelatures established in the 20th century
1953 establishments in the Belgian Congo
Roman Catholic bishops of Kabinda